Angela Robinson is an American actress and singer. She is best known for playing the role of Veronica Harrington in the Oprah Winfrey Network primetime soap opera The Haves and the Have Nots from May 2013 to July 2021.

Life and career
Robinson was born and raised in Jacksonville, Florida. She graduated from William M. Raines High School in Jacksonville and Florida A&M University in Tallahassee, Florida. While in college, she won the crown of Miss Florida A&M University. She moved to New York City in 1992 and began acting career on the stage, appearing on Broadway and Off-Broadway productions. On Broadway, she performed in The Color Purple, and later appeared in the national touring production. Robinson also performed on the national tours of Dreamgirls and The Wizard of Oz. On television, she appeared in the episode "Contagious" of Law & Order: Special Victims Unit in 2005.

From May 2013 to July 2021, Robinson starred as Veronica Harrington, with albeit a high-end and classy presentation, a no-holds-barred prominent villainess on the Oprah Winfrey Network primetime soap opera, The Haves and the Have Nots. The program was produced by Tyler Perry. For her performance on The Haves and the Have Nots, Robinson received a Gracie Award for "Outstanding Female Actor - One to Watch," in 2015. For her cold, calculating rendition of Veronica Harrington, Robinson also earned the label of "Ice Queen" on OWN, the tagline for her character used in numerous OWN advertisements to fuel enthusiasm for upcoming episodes during the show's original run. The label originated from the show's considerable fanbase.

In 2021, Robinson starred as Billie Holiday in the North Carolina Theatre production of Lady Day at Emerson's Bar and Grill. She set to return to television with the 2023 miniseries Lady in the Lake for Apple TV+.

Personal life
In 1996, Robinson married stage actor Scott Whitehurst. In June 2018, they adopted a son named Robinson Scott.

Filmography

References

External links

20th-century American actresses
21st-century American actresses
Actresses from Jacksonville, Florida
African-American actresses
American stage actresses
American soap opera actresses
Florida A&M University alumni
Living people
William M. Raines High School alumni
1963 births
20th-century African-American women
20th-century African-American people
21st-century African-American women
21st-century African-American people